Frank Banda (born 12 January 1991) is a Malawian professional footballer who plays as a midfielder.

On 23 January 2015, Banda join UD Songo on a season loan.

International career

International goals
Scores and results list Malawi's goal tally first.

References

External links 
 

1991 births
Living people
Malawian footballers
Blue Eagles FC players
Civo United FC players
UD Songo players
Malawian expatriate sportspeople in Mozambique
Expatriate footballers in Mozambique
Association football midfielders
Malawian expatriate footballers
Malawi international footballers